Nari Panoos is a village and Union Council of Karak District in Khyber Pakhtunkhwa province of  Pakistan.

Description
Nari Panos is located about 13 kilometers to the north of the city of Karak. It is included in the tehsil Banda Daud shah of district Karak. Nari Panos is union council. The village is rich in Salt mines and the length of mountains containing salt is about 23 kilometers extending from Bhahadar Khel to Spina. Nari Panos is also rich in elements of uranium, gas, oil and other precious things.

Nari Panos is surrounded by Spina at east, Enzarpayan at North, Dagar Nari at West and Salt mountains is its limit boundary with city Karak. Literacy rate of the village is 70 percent and almost every child is on his/her way to school, The focus on education started very early on as the area is dry and agriculture mostly is dependent upon rain so people since the time of independence have started to educate their children resulting in generations of doctors, engineers, teachers, armed officers, civil servants, social activists and nearly every important post in government and bureaucracy. The most renowned people from Karak district are Capt Rtd. Dr Muhammad Aman Khattak (first doctor from district Karak who studied at the prestigious King Edward's Medical College, Lahore in the 1960s and later served on senior GoP positions serving the communities in FATA/KPK when there was shortage of doctors), Khalil ur Rehman (He remained the district education officer and was a Pashto Poet. Apart from his only poetry book published, a great amount of his poetry was lost) Shernawaz Khattak(Renowned Lawyer, ex Law and Parliamentary Affairs Minister of the Government of KPK and political leader), Lt Col Rafique (one of the first few officers from the region in early 1950s and veteran of the two wars with India), Baz Muhammad Khattak (Senior CSP officer/civil servant from DMG and provincial Secretary), Tehsin Ullah khattak S/O Abdul Shahid Khan (Social and Development Sector Specialist), Engineer Ayaz Khattak, Fahim Ullah Khattak (retired senior bureaucrat and finance secretary K.P.K.), Rehman Khattak (Civil Engineer),  Naveed Anwar Khan (Youth President PTI & Serving in Pakistan Nuclear Regulatory Authority). Also, it has produced PMS ( Provincial Management Services) officers, like Yousaf Haroon, Najeed Ullah, Habib Ullah, and many others who excelled in their careers with distinctions.

Several serving and retired servicemen and officers of the Pakistan Armed forces hail from Nari Panos. The village population takes pride in taking military service as a choice of profession keeping alive the rich traditions of their ancestors and hardworking people.

Now the oil and gas companies are looking for mines extraction in "Nari Panos" and "Banda Daud Shah" and already MOL is working in these tehsils however water is a big issue in the region due to dry land.

References

Populated places in Karak District
Karak District